The 2019 La Liga-Serie A Cup was the inaugural edition of a competition between two teams from La Liga and Serie A. Barcelona from La Liga and Napoli from Serie A respectively, were the inaugural participants of this event, and played a two-legged series in the United States with the first leg held on August 7 at Hard Rock Stadium in Miami, Florida and the second leg held on August 10 at Michigan Stadium in Ann Arbor, Michigan.

Teams
Two teams participated in this tournament:

Venues

This tournament was hosted by two venues:

Format 
There is no Away goals rule since both games were played at neutral venues and in case of a tie after 90 minutes a penalty shootout would take place.

Matches

First leg

Second Leg

References

FC Barcelona matches
S.S.C. Napoli matches
2019 in American soccer
August 2019 sports events in the United States
Sports competitions in Miami Gardens, Florida
Sports competitions in Michigan
2019–20 in Italian football
2019–20 in Spanish football
Sports in Ann Arbor, Michigan